Mo Moulton (born 1979) is an American author and historian of 20th century Britain and Ireland, interested in gender, sexuality, and colonialism/postcolonialism. They are a senior lecturer in the history of race and empire at the University of Birmingham.

Education and early life 
Moulton was born in New York in 1979 and grew up in Massachusetts. They majored in history as an undergraduate at the Massachusetts Institute of Technology, graduating Phi Beta Kappa in 2001. After working for non-profit organisations, they returned to graduate study at Brown University, earning a PhD in 2010.

Academic career 
Moulton became a lecturer at Harvard University from 2010 until 2016 before moving to the University of Birmingham as a senior lecturer.

They were elected to the council of the British Association for Irish Studies for the 2021–2023 term.

Personal life 
Moulton identifies as "queer, trans, and nonbinary" and uses singular they as their preferred pronoun. At Birmingham, they are a founder of the College of Arts & Law Trans Support Network.

Bibliography and book awards 
Ireland and the Irish in Interwar England (Cambridge University Press, 2014). Runner-up (proxime accessit) for The Whitfield Prize in 2015
The Mutual Admiration Society: How Dorothy L. Sayers and Her Oxford Circle Remade the World For Women (Basic Books, 2019) about The Mutual Admiration Society. Winner of the 2019 Agatha Award and the 2020 Anthony Award, in their respective non-fiction categories.

References

External links
Home page

Interview with Moulton about Mutual Admiration Society, History: The Journal of the Historical Association, 16 December 2019

1979 births
Living people
21st-century American historians
Non-binary writers
American emigrants to the United Kingdom
LGBT historians
Massachusetts Institute of Technology alumni
Brown University alumni
Harvard University faculty
Academics of the University of Birmingham
Place of birth missing (living people)
Historians from New York (state)
Historians from Massachusetts
Transgender academics